Music Is My Sanctuary is an album by American jazz musician Gary Bartz. It was released in 1977 on Capitol Records.

Track listing 
 "Music Is My Sanctuary"  (Gary Bartz, Sigidi)  6:20 	
 "Carnaval De L'Esprit"  (Gary Bartz)  5:55 	
 "Love Ballad"  (Skip Scarborough)  4:09 	
 "Swing Thing"  (Larry and Fonce Mizell)  6:50 	
 "Ooo Baby Baby"  (Smokey Robinson, Pete Moore)  5:52 	
 "Macaroni"  (Gary Bartz)  6:42

Personnel 
 Gary Bartz - Saxophone (Alto, Soprano), Piano, Electric Piano, Synthesizer, Vocals
 Larry Mizell - Keyboards, Vocals
 George Cables - Piano
 David T. Walker, John Rowin, Juewett Bostick, Wah-Wah Watson - Guitar
 Curtis Robinson, Jr., Welton Gite - Bass
 Howard King, James Gadson, Nate Neblett - Drums
 Bill Summers, James Mtume - Percussion
 Eddie Henderson, Ray Brown - Trumpet
 Sigidi, Syreeta Wright - Vocals

Charts

Singles

References

External links 
 Gary Bartz-Music Is My Sanctuary at Discogs

1977 albums
Albums produced by the Mizell Brothers
Jazz-funk albums
Capitol Records albums
Gary Bartz albums